Bunting (1961–mid-1980s) was a Swedish halfbreed  grey horse made famous for his participation in the Olle Hellbom films by Astrid Lindgrens Pippi Longstocking. He played Pippi's horse Lilla gubben.

Bunting was first called Illbatting and then Batting; he was owned by Rudolf Öberg, and had been a gift for him at his 60th birthday. When it was time to film the Pippi movies the film crew contacted him and used Bunting during filming. Bunting was completely white so the crew had to spray black dots on his skin. They also had to colour him to make him look more like the horse in the books. It was during filming that Inger Nilsson, the actress who played Pippi, chose the name of Lilla gubben. In the books her horse is only mentioned as "the horse".

After the final film was completed Bunting returned to a riding school, and was later moved to a stable in Vallentuna where he later died at the age of 24.

Filmography 
TV - 1969 - Pippi Långstrump
1970 - Pippi Långstrump på de sju haven
1970-På rymmen med Pippi Långstrump
1973 - Här kommer Pippi Långstrump

References

Horse actors
Horses in film and television